Cerium(IV) sulfate, also called ceric sulfate, is an inorganic compound. It exists as the anhydrous salt Ce(SO4)2 as well as a few hydrated forms: Ce(SO4)2(H2O)x, with x equal to 4, 8, or 12.  These salts are yellow to yellow/orange solids that are moderately soluble in water and dilute acids. Its neutral solutions slowly decompose, depositing the light yellow oxide CeO2. Solutions of ceric sulfate have a strong yellow color. The tetrahydrate loses water when heated to 180-200 °C.

It is insoluble in glacial acetic acid and pure (96%) ethanol.

It was historically produced by direct reaction of fine, calcined cerium (IV) oxide and concentrated sulfuric acid, yielding the tetrahydrate.

Uses
The ceric ion is a strong oxidizer, especially under acidic conditions. If ceric sulfate is added to dilute hydrochloric acid, then elemental chlorine is formed, albeit slowly. With stronger reducing agents it reacts much faster. For example, with sulfite in acidic environments it reacts quickly and completely.

When ceric compounds are reduced, so-called cerous compounds are formed. The reaction taking place is:
Ce4+ + e−  →   Ce3+
The cerous ion is colorless.

Ceric sulfate is used in analytical chemistry for redox titration, often together with a redox indicator.

A related compound is ceric ammonium sulfate.

The solubility of Ce(IV) in methanesulfonic acid is approximately 10 times the value obtainable in acidic sulfate solutions.

References

Cerium(IV) compounds
Sulfates
Oxidizing agents